Hughie Charles (24 July 1907 – 6 October 1995), was an English songwriter and producer of musical theatre. Born Charles Hugh Owen Ferry in Manchester, he is best known for co-writing the songs "We'll Meet Again" and "There'll Always Be an England" with Ross Parker.

References

External links 
 
 

British songwriters
1907 births
1995 deaths
Musicians from Manchester